Network Tera Love Ka is an Indian devotional album released by Dera Sacha Sauda head Gurmeet Ram Rahim Singh in April, 2012. The song lyrics focus on inspiring devotion towards God and are sung in the Rajasthani, Punjabi, Hindi and Haryanvi languages.

Tracks
 Kasam Se(Hindi)
 Vanaj(Punjabi)
 Kesariya(Rajasthani)
 Aye Yaara(Hindi)
 Ghent Yaara(Punjabi)
 Jaildara(Hindi)
 Jhanjhar(Punjabi)
 Andy(Haryanvi)
 Network Tere Love Ka(Hindi)

References

Gurmeet Ram Rahim Singh albums
2012 albums